Gwembe District is a district of Zambia, located in Southern Province. The capital now lies at Munyumbwe (the capital was formerly Gwembe Town). As of the 2016 Zambian Census, the district had a population of 53,117 people.

References

Districts of Southern Province, Zambia